Fernando Augusto de Abreu Ferreira (born 3 October 1984), known as Abreu, is a Brazilian professional footballer who plays as a central defender.

He also holds Portuguese citizenship.

Football career
Born in São Paulo, Abreu played youth football for four clubs, two of them abroad and the last being Torino FC. In 2003, aged not yet 19, he moved to Spain and signed for Racing de Santander, being registered with the B-side for the vast majority of his four-year spell; on 17 June 2007, the final day of the season, he played his only La Liga game, which consisted of five minutes in a 0–2 home loss against Real Betis.

For the 2007–08 campaign, Abreu joined another reserve team in the country and the third division, Atlético Madrid B. In the 2009 summer he signed with NK Olimpija Ljubljana in the Slovenian PrvaLiga, moving in quick succession to Olympiakos Nicosia (Cyprus) and IFK Mariehamn (Finland's Veikkausliiga).

On 7 January 2012, Abreu changed clubs and countries again, reuniting with countryman and former Santander teammate Arthuro at Malaysia's Johor Darul Takzim FC.

References

External links

Stats at PrvaLiga 

1984 births
Living people
Footballers from São Paulo
Brazilian footballers
Association football defenders
La Liga players
Segunda División B players
Tercera División players
Rayo Cantabria players
Racing de Santander players
Atlético Madrid B players
Slovenian PrvaLiga players
NK Olimpija Ljubljana (2005) players
Cypriot First Division players
Olympiakos Nicosia players
Veikkausliiga players
IFK Mariehamn players
Malaysia Super League players
Johor Darul Ta'zim F.C. players
A Lyga players
FK Ekranas players
Fernando Abreu
Fernando Abreu
Fernando Abreu
Brazilian expatriate footballers
Expatriate footballers in Spain
Expatriate footballers in Slovenia
Expatriate footballers in Cyprus
Expatriate footballers in Finland
Expatriate footballers in Malaysia
Expatriate footballers in Lithuania
Expatriate footballers in Thailand
Brazilian expatriate sportspeople in Spain
Brazilian expatriate sportspeople in Thailand
Brazilian expatriate sportspeople in Lithuania
Brazilian expatriate sportspeople in Malaysia
Brazilian expatriate sportspeople in Finland
Brazilian expatriate sportspeople in Cyprus
Brazilian expatriate sportspeople in Slovenia